Hunter was an Australian espionage adventure television series screened by the Nine Network from Tuesday 4 July 1967 to 1969. The series was created by Ian Jones and produced by Crawford Productions.

Series synopsis 
The title character, John Hunter, was an agent working for SCU3, a sub-division of the ASIO-like COSMIC (Commonwealth Office of Security & Military Intelligence Co-ordination). While it is mentioned in episodes that "Hunter" is a status level for agents (similar to the "Double-O" status of James Bond), with the title character being "Hunter 5"; he gives "Hunter" as his surname both in current scenes and flashback sequences. He was played by Tony Ward. 
 
However, he was quickly overshadowed by the show's main antagonist, Kragg, an agent employed by the Australian operation of the CUCW (Council for the Unification of the Communist World). Played by Gerard Kennedy, Kragg became the show's breakout character, with Kennedy winning a TV Week Logie Award for Best New Talent for his portrayal of the character.

SCU3 was the Melbourne-based arm of COSMIC, headed by Charles Blake (Nigel Lovell), with offices in the former National Mutual building or St Kilda Road. Blake's secretary was Eve Halliday (played by Fernande Glyn), who also acted as a field agent. Halliday was replaced for the second season by the recurring character of Julie Coleman (played by Anne Morgan), with real-life police detective Gordon Timmins appearing as agent Doug Marshall (Timmins played a character of the same name in Homicide, on which he also acted as police advisor, although the two roles were not the same character).

The CUCW or simply the Council was overseen by Mr. Smith (Ronald Morse), with overseas superiors appearing from time to time, notably the bearded Vargon (Jack Hume).

Production
Scripts were written by Ian Jones and Terry Stapleton. The series became extremely popular rating in the top-ten most popular programs in Australia for 1967, and had a run of 65 one-hour episodes; it also achieved a limited number of international sales. It was shot in black and white, with interior scenes shot on videotape in the GTV-9 Richmond studio and outdoor scenes shot on location on 16 mm film. Compared to Australian drama series of the day, the series featured an above-average quota of location-shot action footage and stunts. It featured a sophisticated jazz score by reed player Frank Smith. The Melbourne-based show filmed some episodes in Sydney and in the Snowy Mountains in New South Wales, on the Gold Coast, Queensland, in South Australia, and overseas in Singapore.

Initially stories were serialised over three and four-episode story arcs. Soon the decision was made to switch to stand-alone episodes. After episode 15 episodes largely featured a self-contained story, apart from two subsequent two-part stories. Kevin Sanders, a GTV-9 news journalist and announcer, supplied the opening narration setting up the lead character and premise over the main title sequence.

Series evolution
As the series progressed the immense popularity of the villain Kragg presented several problems. Apart from apparently being more popular amongst viewers than the show's title character, in the stories the villain invariably had to defeat the ostensible hero in order to still be around for the next episode. In a concession to the character's popularity, Kragg ultimately defected to the side of good. Series star Tony Ward had been somewhat dissatisfied with the direction his character was taking and the increased emphasis on Kragg, and late in the show's run suggested that the high output of episodes by this stage had outstripped the ability of the writers.

Late in the show's run and after some disagreements with the show's producers, Ward left the series to pursue movie options - "John Hunter" was executed by a firing squad in an East European country after a mission went wrong (filmed in Old Melbourne Gaol). A new lead spy (Gil Martin) was introduced, portrayed by British import Rod Mullinar. Mullinar completed eight episodes of the series before it was cancelled. Keen to retain the services of Kennedy, Crawford's decided that new police series Division 4 was a better vehicle for his talents. They convinced the Nine Network to cancel Hunter and proceed with Division 4, which indeed emerged as a popular success. Mullinar subsequently took the lead role in another Crawford's drama series, Ryan (1973).

Home Media

References

External links
 Hunter at Classic Australian Television
 Hunter at Crawford Productions
 

Nine Network original programming
1967 Australian television series debuts
1969 Australian television series endings
Black-and-white Australian television shows
Television shows set in Victoria (Australia)
1960s Australian crime television series
Television series by Crawford Productions
1960s Australian drama television series